Fort-on-Shore, built in 1778 by William Linn, was the first on-shore fort on the Ohio River in the area of what is now downtown Louisville, Kentucky.  George Rogers Clark had directed Linn to move the militia post to the mainland from its original off-shore location at Corn Island. The fort was located near the current intersection of Twelfth and Rowan Streets.

By 1781, the new fort would already prove insufficient, and thus Fort Nelson was constructed upriver.

See also
History of Louisville, Kentucky

References

Former buildings and structures in Louisville, Kentucky
Forts in Kentucky
History of Louisville, Kentucky
Kentucky in the American Revolution
Pre-statehood history of Kentucky